Bukit Ho Swee Constituency (SMC) was a constituency in Singapore. It used to exist from 1968 to 1984. It was carved out from Delta SMC.

Member of Parliament

Elections

Elections in the 1960s

Elections in the 1970s

References 

Singaporean electoral divisions
Tiong Bahru